Arkansas Highway 117 (AR 117, Hwy. 117) is a north–south state highway in Lawrence County, Arkansas. The route of  runs from a junction of Highway 25 and Highway 230 in Strawberry north across US Route 63/US 412 (US 63/US 412) to 3rd Street in Black Rock.

Route description
The route begins at a junction of Highway 25/Highway 230 in Strawberry and runs north. Highway 117 forms a concurrency with Highway 115 at Jesop until Smithville. The routes pass the National Register of Historic Places-listed Smithville Public School Building before Highway 115 turns north with Highway 117 continuing east. After passing through Denton the route intersects Highway 117S toward Powhatan. The highway curves north to intersect US 63/US 412 in Black Rock, forming a concurrency east.

Major intersections
Mile markers reset at concurrencies.

|-
| align=center colspan=4 |  concurrency north, 
|-

|-
| align=center colspan=4 |  concurrency east, 
|-

Powhatan spur

Arkansas Highway 117 Spur (AR 117S, Hwy. 117S) is a  spur route. The route begins at Highway 117 and runs southeast to Powhatan. Several properties on the National Register of Historic Places are contained in Powhatan and the adjacent Powhatan Courthouse State Park including the Powhatan Courthouse.

Major intersections

References

External links

117
Transportation in Lawrence County, Arkansas